Robert Earl Maxwell (March 15, 1924 – November 20, 2010) was a United States district judge of the United States District Court for the Northern District of West Virginia.

Education and career

Born in South Bend, Indiana, Maxwell received a Bachelor of Laws from West Virginia University College of Law in 1949. He was in private practice in Randolph County, West Virginia in 1949. He was prosecuting attorney of Elkins, West Virginia from 1953 to 1961. He was the United States Attorney for the Northern District of West Virginia from 1961 to 1964.

Federal judicial service

On July 19, 1965, Maxwell was nominated by President Lyndon B. Johnson to a seat on the United States District Court for the Northern District of West Virginia vacated by Judge Charles Ferguson Paul. Maxwell was confirmed by the United States Senate on August 11, 1965, and received his commission the same day. He served as Chief Judge from 1965 to 1994, and assumed senior status on July 19, 1995. His service terminated on November 20, 2010, due to his death in Elkins.

References

Sources
 

1924 births
2010 deaths
County prosecuting attorneys in West Virginia
Judges of the United States District Court for the Northern District of West Virginia
People from Elkins, West Virginia
People from South Bend, Indiana
United States Attorneys for the Northern District of West Virginia
United States district court judges appointed by Lyndon B. Johnson
West Virginia University College of Law alumni
20th-century American judges